Brentwood Middle School may refer to:
Brentwood Middle School (Greeley, Colorado)
Brentwood Middle School (Brentwood, Missouri)
Brentwood Middle School (Brentwood, Tennessee)